Saint Pantaenus the Philosopher (died c. 200) was a Greek theologian and a significant figure in the Catechetical School of Alexandria from around AD 180. This school was the earliest catechetical school, and became influential in the development of Christian theology.

Biography
Pantaenus was a Stoic philosopher teaching in Alexandria. He was a native of Sicily. He converted to the Christian faith, and sought to reconcile his new faith with Greek philosophy. His most famous student, Clement, who was his successor as head of the Catechetical School, described Pantaenus as "the Sicilian bee". Although no writings by Pantaenus are extant, his legacy is known by the influence of the Catechetical School on the development of Christian theology, in particular in the early debates on the interpretation of the Bible, the Trinity, and Christology. He was the main supporter of Serapion of Antioch for acting against the influence of Gnosticism.

In addition to his work as a teacher, Eusebius of Caesarea reports that Pantaenus was for a time a missionary, traveling as far as India where, according to Eusebius, he found Christian communities using the Gospel of Matthew written in "Hebrew letters", supposedly left them by the Apostle Bartholomew (and which might have been the Gospel of the Hebrews). This may indicate that Syrian Christians, using a Syriac version of the New Testament, had already evangelized parts of India by the late 2nd century. However, some writers have suggested that having difficulty with the language of Saint Thomas Christians, Pantaenus misinterpreted their reference to Mar Thoma (the Aramaic term meaning Saint Thomas), who is currently credited with bringing Christianity to India in the 1st century by the Syrian Churches, as Bar Tolmai (the Hebrew name of Bartholomew). The ancient seaport Muziris on the Malabar Coast (modern-day Kerala in India) was frequented by the Egyptians in the early centuries AD.

Saint Jerome (c. 347 – 30 September 420), apparently relying entirely on Eusebius' evidence from Historia Ecclesiastica, wrote that Pantaenus visited India, “to preach Christ to the Brahmans and philosophers there.” It is unlikely that Jerome has any information about Pantaenus' mission to India that is independent of Eusebius. On the other hand, his claim that "many" of Pantaenus' Biblical commentaries were still extant is probably based on Jerome's own knowledge.

His feast day as July 7.

The Coptic synaxarium mentions "Pantaenus and Clement" in its entry regarding the return of the relics of St Mark the Apostle by Pope Paul VI of Rome on 15 Paoni but does not assign Pantaenus any specific feast date.

19th century and modern study on Pantaenus
The Universalist Church of America historian J. W. Hanson (1899) argued that Pantaenus "must, beyond question" have taught Universalism to Clement of Alexandria and Origen. However, since it is now considered that Clement of Alexandria's views contained a tension between salvation and freewill, and that he and Origen did not clearly teach universal reconciliation of all immortal souls in their understanding of apokatastasis, Hanson's conclusion about Pantaenus lacks a firm basis.

References

External links 
 "St. Pantænus, Father of the Church", Butler's Lives of the Saints
 Saint Bartholomew Mission in India – Mission of Pantaenus in India
 Catholic Encyclopedia, s.v. "Saint Pantaenus"
 Saint Pantaenus in For all the Saints

Saints from Roman Egypt
Egyptian theologians
Greek educators
Sicilian saints
216 deaths
Christian theologians
Stoic philosophers
2nd-century Christian saints
Year of birth unknown
2nd-century births
2nd-century Christian theologians